Pol Arias Dourdet (born 8 August 1996) is an Andorran swimmer. He competed in the men's 400 metre freestyle event at the 2016 Summer Olympics.

References

External links
 

1996 births
Living people
Andorran male freestyle swimmers
Olympic swimmers of Andorra
Swimmers at the 2016 Summer Olympics
Place of birth missing (living people)